Wülfrath-Aprath station is located in the town of Wülfrath in the German state of North Rhine-Westphalia. It is on the Wuppertal-Vohwinkel–Essen-Überruhr line. The station was originally opened in 1847, but closed in 1964 or 1965. A station building was built in 1848, but it burnt down in 1990. The station was re-established in 2002 and is classified by Deutsche Bahn as a category 5 station.

The station is served by Rhine-Ruhr S-Bahn line S 9 (Recklinghausen / Haltern– Gladbeck - Wuppertal - Hagen), operating every 30 minutes during the day.

It is also served by two bus routes operated by WSW mobil: 601 (at 60 minute intervals) and 621 (at 20 minute intervals).

Notes

Rhine-Ruhr S-Bahn stations
S9 (Rhine-Ruhr S-Bahn)
Railway stations in Germany opened in 1847
1847 establishments in Prussia
Buildings and structures in Mettmann (district)